George Henry Law  (12 September 1761 – 22 September 1845) was the Bishop of Chester (1812) and then, from 1824, Bishop of Bath and Wells.

Born at the lodge of Peterhouse, Cambridge, of which his father Edmund Law (who later became Bishop of Carlisle) was Master, Law was educated at Charterhouse School and at Queens' College, Cambridge, where he was second wrangler.  His main claim to fame was the way in which he introduced a systematic and rigorous training system for parish priests.

He founded a theological college at St Bees in Cumbria.  There had been once been a monastery at St Bees, but since the dissolution in 1539 many of the monastic buildings had disappeared and chancel stood roofless when Bishop Law visited Whitehaven in 1816.  He was short of good clergy for the diocese, which included Lancashire, and was at that time the powerhouse of the industrial revolution.  The consequent growth in population increased the demand for clergymen.  Up until Bishop Law's college, training for clergy was haphazard.  Most were ordained on the strength of a degree from Oxford or Cambridge, whilst some were ordained after individual instruction from a member of the clergy.   Resulting clergy were variable and did not meet a reliable standard.  Law was determined to improve the supply situation so when Law visited Whitehaven and met the influential Lowther family and they agreed to pay for restoration of the chancel for a new theogical college he accepted the offer.  The agreement allowed Law to appoint the new vicar  for St Bees and Principal of the College, contrary to the practice of patronage at the time, and so the St Bees Theological College was born.  It was the first theological training institution of the Anglican Church outside Oxford or Cambridge.

The Lowthers did not act out of pure generosity.  They were keen to improve their public image having been accused of acquiring the mineral rights to Whitehaven for a pittance from St Bees School, and were also suspected of having tried to keep the matter quiet by arranging the sacking of the headmaster.

Family
Law was the younger brother of Bishop John Law (1745–1810), Ewan Law  (1747–1829), Lord Chief Justice Lord Ellenborough (1750–1818), and Thomas Law (1756–1834), a property investor in Washington, D.C.

On 13 July 1784, Law married Jane Adeane, daughter of General James Whorwood Adeane . They had the following children:

 Anna Law (1786–1832)
 Joanna Law (1787–1848), married Alexander Powell 
 Augusta Law (1789–1822), married Rev. James Slade
 James Thomas Law (1790–1876), chancellor of the Diocese of Lichfield
 George Law (1794–1811)
 Henry Law (1797–1884), Dean of Gloucester
 Robert Vanbrugh Law (1799–1884), clergyman
 Jane Waugh Law (1801–1843), married Rev. Robert Harkness
 Margaret Law (1803–1838)

References

External links
 
  

1761 births
1845 deaths
Bishops of Chester
Bishops of Bath and Wells
19th-century Church of England bishops
Second Wranglers
Alumni of Queens' College, Cambridge
Fellows of the Royal Society
People educated at Charterhouse School
Fellows of Queens' College, Cambridge